Grigori Lvovich Roshal (October 21, 1899 – January 11, 1983) was a Soviet film director and screenwriter. He directed 26 films between 1926 and 1968.

Biography
Grigori Roshal was born on 21 in October 1899 (according to other sources either on 20 in October 1899 or in 1898 ), in the city of Novozybkov (now Bryansk Oblast, Russia).

After graduating from the Tenishev School in St. Petersburg he was employed at the People's Commissariat for Education of Ukraine and Crimea between the years 1918 and 1919. Since 1919 he was an instructor at the People's Commissariat of Azerbaijan, selected as head of the artistic and educational part of the children's playground in Zheleznovodsk. In 1921 he moved to Moscow to work in the People's Commissariat for Russia as an instructor in the school theater, was chairman of the Council on Arts Education Main Department of Social Education and taught the subject of theater at the Central House of the communist education of the working youth.

Between 1921-1923 he studied at the State Higher Director's Workshops of Vsevolod Meyerhold (GVYRM) created in 1921 by Vsevolod Meyerhold and his pupil Konstantin Derzhavin which were revised in 1923 and conducted under the name GEKTEMAS - State Experimental Theater Workshop in 1931.

Since 1923 he worked as a theater director. He supervised the Pedagogical Workshop Theatre and has staged a number of performances. Until 1927 was the director and artistic manager of the theater.

From 1925 he was director of the third factory of Goskino, the studio Belgoskino, Mezhrabpomfilm and All-Ukrainian Photo Cinema Administration (VUFKU).

As of 1931 he was the director of Mosfilm and director of the Lenfilm film studio in the years 1947-1954.

In 1949 he wrote a chapter on Soviet cinema for the book "Experiment in Film".

Was appointed as teacher at the Gerasimov Institute of Cinematography between the years 1953-1964. In 1957 he headed the All-Union Committee for Work with film enthusiasts under the rule of the Cinematographers Union of the USSR.

In the 1970s he taught at the Moscow State Art and Cultural University giving a course for new specialist-teachers directing of amateur film studios. Founder and artistic director of the film department in this university.

Grigori Roshal died on 11 January 1983 and was buried in Moscow at the Kuntsevo Cemetery.

Family
Vera Stroyeva - wife, director and playwright.
Marianna Rochal - daughter, director of feature films.

Selected filmography
 His Excellency (1928)
 Salamander (1928)
 The Oppenheim Family (1936)
 Dawn of Paris (1939)
 Ivan Pavlov (1949)
 Mussorgsky (1950)
 Rimsky-Korsakov (1952)
The Sisters (1957)

References

External links

1899 births
1983 deaths
People from Novozybkov
Soviet film directors
Soviet screenwriters
Male screenwriters
People's Artists of the USSR
Academic staff of the Gerasimov Institute of Cinematography
Belarusfilm films
20th-century screenwriters